Benadi  is a village in the North-Western region of Karnataka state near Maharashtra Border in India. 
It is located in the Chikodi taluka of Belgaum district in Karnataka. Before it was a part of Bombay State and Princely state of Kolhapur. It is a part of Twin Village Aadi-Benadi. People who has origin from this village are known as Benadikar.

Demographics
 India census, Benadi had a population of 5,882, with 3,030 males and 2,852 females.
The main language is Kannada, but Marathi is spoken widely. 
Benadi is located at 15 km from Nipani and 35 km from Kolhapur.

Tourist attractions and education 

Benadi is located near the Western Ghats and has on one side the Vedganga and Dudhganga rivers and hills on the other side. There is an old temple of Lord Siddeshwar in front of a lake in Benadi.  There is a Basaveshwar Temple in the village. The nearest city is Kolhapur, it is just 25 miles away and is well connected by road, rail and air.

Benadi has primary schools and igher Secondary Colleges located within it. Both Marathi and Kannada-language schools are present in the village. It has Marathi High School which was established in per-independence period. This High School is now also a Higher Secondary College, which is named after Anandrao Patil, a social worker from Benadi.

Notable people

 Gulabrao Patil, Marathi Film Director
 Dinkar D patil

References

External links

Villages in Belagavi district